Replay may refer to:

 Replay (sports), a replayed match between two sport teams

Technology
 Game replay, a recording of a game session.
 Instant replay, in motion pictures and television, a showing again of part of a film
 Replay Professional, a hardware sound sampling device used by the atari ST
 ReplayTV, a digital video recorder (DVR)
 Replay attack, in cryptography, an attack involving insertion of a message that has been sent previously
 Replay system of NetBurst architecture microprocessors
 REPLAY (software), a management system for audiovisual content developed at ETH Zurich

Books
 Replay (Grimwood novel), a 1986 science fiction novel by Ken Grimwood
 Replay (Creech novel), a 2005 book by Sharon Creech
 Replay: The History of Video Games, a 2010 book by Tristan Donovan
 RE:Play, a 2006 original English-language manga by Christy Lijewski

Film and television
 Replay (2001 film), a 2001 French drama film
 Replay (2003 film), a 2003 film starring Rebecca Mader
 Replay (TV sports series), a Fox Sports Net series featuring alumni from two sports teams, who replay a notable game from their past
 Replay (TV series), a Canadian sports talk show television series
 "Replay" (The Twilight Zone), 2019 episode of the television series The Twilight Zone
 Replay (web series), a 2021 South Korean web drama.

Music

Albums
 Replay (Crosby, Stills & Nash album), a 1980 album by the rock group Crosby, Stills & Nash
 Replay (Alison Brown album), a 2002 album by American banjoist Alison Brown
 Replay (Play album), a 2003 album by Swedish girl group Play
 Replay (Iyaz album), a 2010 album by British Virgin Island singer Iyaz
 Replay (The Outfield album), a 2011 album by English rock band The Outfield
 Rush Replay X 3, a 2006 set of filmed concerts from Rush
 Replay (EP), 2008 EP by South Korean boy band Shinee

Songs
 "Replay" (Iyaz song), a 2009 song by Iyaz
 "Replay" (Mr. Children song), a 1993 song by Japanese band Mr. Children
 "Replay" (Shinee song), a 2008 song by Shinee
 "Replay" (Tamta song), a 2019 song that represented Cyprus in the Eurovision Song Contest 2019
 "Replay" (Zendaya song), a 2013 song by Zendaya
 "Replay", a 1995 song by Millencolin from the album Life on a Plate
 "Replay", a 2013 song by Vamps from the single "Ahead/Replay"
 "Replay", a 2020 song by Lady Gaga from Chromatica
 "Replay", a 2021 song by Senidah

Other uses
 Replay pen, the brand name in Europe and Brazil for the Papermate Erasermate pen
 Replay XD1080, a tubular action cam.